Antipope Felix (died 22 November 365) was a Roman archdeacon in the 4th century who was installed irregularly in 355 as an antipope and reigned until 365 after Emperor Constantius II banished the then current pope, Liberius. Constantius, following the refusal of the laity to accept Felix, attempted to have them co-rule, but Felix was forced to retire. He was resented in his lifetime but has enjoyed a more popular memory since. In the Roman Catholic Church, an antipope described any figure attempting to oppose the legitimately elected Bishop of Rome.

Biography
In May AD 357 the Roman laity, which had remained faithful to Liberius, demanded that Constantius, who was on a visit to Rome, should recall Liberius. Constantius planned to have Felix and Liberius rule jointly, but when Liberius returned Felix was forced to retire to Porto (near Rome) where, after making an unsuccessful attempt to establish himself again in Rome, he died on 22 November AD 365.

This Felix was later confused with a Roman martyr named Felix, with the result that he was included in lists of the popes as Felix II and that the succeeding popes of the same name (Pope Felix III and Pope Felix IV) were given wrong numerals, as was Antipope Felix V.

However, a more recent source says that of the martyr Felix nothing is known except his name, that he was a martyr, and that he was buried in the cemetery on the Via Portuensis that bears his name.

The Catholic Encyclopedia remarked that "the real story of the antipope was lost and he obtained in local Roman history the status of a saint and a confessor. As such, he appears in the Roman Martyrology on 29 July." At that time (1909) the Roman Martyrology had the following text:  This entry was based on what the Catholic Encyclopedia called later legends that confound the relative positions of Felix and Liberius. More recent editions of the Roman Martyrology have instead: 

The feast day of the Roman martyr Felix is 29 July. The antipope Felix died, as stated above, on a 22 November, and his death was not a martyr's, occurring when the Peace of Constantine had been in force for half a century.

As well as the Roman Martyrology, the Roman Missal identified the Saint Felix of 29 July with the antipope. This identification, still found in the 1920 typical edition, does not appear in the 1962 typical edition. To judge by the Marietti printing of 1952, which omits the numeral "II" and the word "Papae", the correction had already been made by then. One Catholic writer excuses this by saying that the antipope "himself did refuse to accept Arianism, and so his feast has been kept in the past on [29 July]".

See also
 Papal selection before 1059

References

External links
The Papal Schism between Liberius and Felix (a primary source)
Encyclopædia Britannica: Felix (II)

Felix II
Felix II
4th-century antipopes
4th-century Christian clergy
Felix II
Ancient Christians involved in controversies
Felix II
Date of birth unknown
Place of birth unknown
Place of death unknown